Qımır (also, Kymyr) is a village in the Zaqatala Rayon of Azerbaijan.  The village forms part of the municipality of Çobankol.

Origins
Qımır is one of the villages in the Caucasus where the Cimmerians (Gmry) are believed to have settled during the I millennium BC. Cimmerians were nomads who were successful in attacking Urartu and conquering Lydia in Anatolia.
According to Herodotus, Cimmerians (Qımıroi) have fled through Caucasus to Anatolia.
Possible that a small group of nomadic Cimmerians, has settled  in the Caucasus and the Village name of Qımır is an ethnotoponym.

References

External links

Populated places in Zaqatala District